Craspedopoma trochoideum is a species of tropical land snails with an operculum, terrestrial gastropod mollusks in the family Craspedopomatidae.

This species is endemic to Madeira, Portugal.

References

Endemic fauna of Madeira
Molluscs of Europe
Craspedopoma
Gastropods described in 1860
Taxa named by Richard Thomas Lowe
Taxonomy articles created by Polbot
Craspedopomatidae